Bibinagar is a Mandal in Yadadri Bhuvanagiri district of the Indian state of Telangana. It is located in Bibinagar mandal of Bhongir revenue division. It is famous for All India Institute of Medical Sciences, Bibinagar.

Governance 

Bibinagar Grama panchayat is the local self-government.

References

External links 

Mandal headquarters in Yadadri Bhuvanagiri district
Census towns in Yadadri Bhuvanagiri district